New York's 61st State Senate district is one of 63 districts in the New York State Senate. It has been represented by Republican Edward Rath III since 2021, succeeding fellow Republican Michael Ranzenhofer.

Geography
District 61 stretches from Buffalo's inner suburbs to the southwestern corner of Rochester, including parts of Erie and Monroe Counties and all of Genesee County.

The district overlaps with New York's 24th, 25th, and 26th congressional districts, and with the 137th, 138th, 139th, 144th, and 146th districts of the New York State Assembly.

Recent election results

2020

2018

2016

2014

2012

Federal results in District 61

References

61